Fedun is a gender-neutral Slavic surname that may refer to
Leonid Fedun (born 1956), Russian billionaire businessman
Taylor Fedun (born 1988), Ukrainian-Canadian ice hockey player
William Fedun (1879–1949), Canadian politician

Russian-language surnames